Alex Prager (born 1979) is an American photographer and filmmaker, based in Los Angeles. She makes staged color photographs.

Early life
Prager was born in Los Feliz, Los Angeles. She dropped out of school at sixteen.

Career
She took up photography after viewing an exhibition of William Eggleston's at the Getty Museum when she was age 21. She is self-taught.

In 2005, Prager created a group of works, The Book of Disquiet, as an exhibition and joint publication with artist Mercedes Helnwein. She exhibited Polyester in 2007, which focused on what is now described as her signature cinematic styled portraits set in Los Angeles. Her next series, The Big Valley, was shown in 2008. In 2010 Prager exhibited Week-End as well as debuted her first short film, Despair. Despair was conceived in London during The Big Valley exhibition, where viewers were inquiring what happened before and after to the subjects in her photographic work. The film starring Bryce Dallas Howard was a full-sensory version of Prager's photographs in motion, showing the before, now and after of one of her images. Her intention was to create pure, cinematic melodrama through the use of an array of artistic mediums—imagery, motion, color, sculpture, painting and sound. Prager's Despair was included in the Museum of Modern Art's exhibition New Photography 2010.

In 2011 Kathy Ryan, director of photography for The New York Times Magazine commissioned Prager to shoot 12, 1 minute films with some film actors from that year, inspired by "cinematic villainy". Prager won a News and Documentary Emmy Award for New Approaches to News & Documentary Programming: Arts, Lifestyle & Culture for her Touch of Evil short films.

In 2012, Prager addressed themes of disaster and spatial turbulence with the series Compulsion. Her short film La Petite Mort starring French actress Judith Godreche with narration from Gary Oldman was shown alongside the body of work. The film was a "contemplation on death" and "a way for [her] to deal with the hopelessness [she] was feeling about the world. Creating a parallel universe where tragedies happen but with a sense of lightness as well."

Prager's series, Face in the Crowd, debuted at Washington D.C.'s Corcoran Gallery of Art in 2013.

She was commissioned by the Paris Opera in 2015 to create a film for 3e Scène. The film, La Grande Sortie, explores the tension between a performer's experience on stage and the audience watching. It stars Émilie Cozette and includes Karl Paquette dancing to an adapted score by Nigel Godrich. The film was produced by Jeremy Dawson. La Grande Sortie premiered at 3e Scène on September 15, 2015 and showed elsewhere.

In 2019, Prager exhibited her most autobiographical body of work to date, which included photographs and a new film, Play the Wind. Part One: The Mountain was exhibited in January 2022.

Reception
Prager's staged color photographs are described by Ken Johnson as being influenced by Cindy Sherman, Philip-Lorca diCorcia and Douglas Sirk.

MoMA curator Roxana Marcoci has described her work as "intentionally loaded", saying "it reminds me of silent movies— there is something pregnant, about to happen, a mix of desire and angst."

Michael Govan, the director of Los Angeles County Museum of Art has said that 
Prager's photographic and filmic compositions, like Eggleston's photographs, Alfred Hitchcock's films, and Edward Hopper's paintings, reveal the extraordinary lurking within the ordinary. Wreaking havoc with our involuntary voyeurism and our tendency to leap to conclusions about people's characters based on the merest details of their appearances, Prager cues our own fantasies by representing her own.

Publications
The Big Valley / Week-end, M+B and Yancey Richardson Gallery. 2010. .
Compulsion, Michael Hoppen Gallery. 2012. .
Face in the Crowd, Corcoran. 2013). .
La Grande Sortie, Lehmann Maupin. 2016. .
Silver Lake Drive, Thames & Hudson. .

Films
 Despair (2010) – starring Bryce Dallas Howard
 Touch of Evil (2011) 
 La Petite Mort (2012) – starring Judith Godreche, Gary Oldman
 Sunday (2012)
 Face in the Crowd (2013) – starring Elizabeth Banks
 La Grande Sortie (2015) – starring Emilie Cozette, Karl Paquette
 Uncanny Valley (2018) – starring Cate Blanchett
 Play the Wind (2019) – starring Riley Keough and Dimitri Chamblas

Exhibitions
 New Photography 2010, Museum of Modern Art, New York, 2010
 Compulsion, Foam Fotografiemuseum Amsterdam, 2012
 Mise-en-scène, Savannah College of Art and Design, 2013
 Face in the Crowd, Corcoran Gallery of Art, 2013; The Arts Club, London, 2014
 Alex Prager, The National Gallery of Victoria, Australia, 2014
 The Noir Effect, Skirball Cultural Center, Los Angeles, 2014
 Alex Prager, Istanbul '74, Istanbul, 2015
 Alex Prager: Silver Lake Drive, The Photographers' Gallery, London, 2018; Museum of Fine Arts Le Locle, Le Locle, Switzerland, 2018; Foam Fotografiemuseum, Amsterdam, 2019
 Welcome Home, Fotografiska, Stockholm, 2019; Fotografiska, Tallinn, Estonia, 2020
Alex Prager: Farewell, Work Holiday Parties, Los Angeles County Museum of Art, Los Angeles, CA, 2020

Awards
2012: News and Documentary Emmy Award for New Approaches to News & Documentary Programming: Arts, Lifestyle & Culture for The New York Times-commissioned piece Touch of Evil, starring Jessica Chastain, George Clooney, Glenn Close, Kirsten Dunst, Rooney Mara, Brad Pitt, and others
2012: Foam Paul Huf Award, Foam Fotografiemuseum Amsterdam

References

External links 

Photographers from California
Living people
1979 births